Parrandera, Rebelde y Atrevida is the seventh major label studio album by Regional Mexican singer Jenni Rivera, released on September 20, 2005 by Fonovisa Records. The album was produced by Rivera's father, Pedro Rivera.

Parrandera, Rebelde y Atrevida reached number ten on the Billboard Top Latin Albums Chart in the United States. It was certified double platinum in the United States and certified gold in Mexico. Alex Henderson of Allmusic gave the album a rating of 4 out of 5 and described Rivera as "...a delightfully ironic and unique figure in Regional Mexican music."

Track listing

Chart performance

Certifications

References

2005 albums
Jenni Rivera albums
Fonovisa Records albums